JCD may refer to:

Doctor of Canon Law, a doctoral-level terminal degree in the studies of canon law of the Roman Catholic Church
Jatiyatabadi Chhatra Dal, the student wing of the Bangladesh Nationalist Party
John C. Dvorak, an American columnist and broadcaster in the areas of technology and computing.